Born in Melbourne, Australia, Luke Parker (born 21 October 1993) is an Australian cyclist currently living in Ormond, Victoria.
Representing Australia. he previously competed at the 2011 UCI Junior World Track Championships in Moscow, Russia, where he and the team achieved 4th place in the Team Sprint event.
In March 2012, he was the winner of Australia's most prestigious track cycling event, the Austral Wheel Race.  In 2014 he was the winner of another prestigious track race, The Melbourne Cup on Wheels (MCOW) and became one of the few to win the Austral and MCOW double.

Personal life 

Parker attends Australian Catholic University (ACU) in Melbourne, Victoria and is studying for a Bachelor of Exercise and Sports Science.

Cycling History 

In 2006, Parker took up cycling and joined Carnegie Caulfield, his local cycling club. Shortly after, in 2007, he gained entry into The Australian Sports Commission's National Talent ID Program (NTID), designed to foster young talent in cycling.

In 2010, he was awarded a VIS scholarship.

Major results

Best Overall Records 
 Australian Record Holder, U19 Flying 200m in a time of 10.165 seconds - Moscow, Russia
 2011 Australian Championship & All Comers Record, Team Sprint - 46.457 sec on 06.02.2011 - Sydney, NSW
Luke Parker, Jacob Schmid, Jaron Gardiner

2009 
 Silver — U17 Victorian Junior Track Championships, Sprint
 Bronze — U17 Victorian Junior Track Championships, Time Trial
 Gold — U17 Australian National Track Championships, Team Sprint
(Luke Parker, Evan Hull, Jaron Gardiner)

2010 
 Gold — U19 Australian National Track Championships, Team Sprint
(Luke Parker, Nathan Corrigan-Martella, Maddison Hammond)

2011 
 Gold    - U19 Australian National Track Championships, Team Sprint
 Bronze - U19 Australian National Track Championships, Sprint
 Bronze - U19 Australian National Track Championships, Keirin
 4th      - UCI Junior Track World Championships, Team Sprint
(Luke Parker, Timothy McMillan, Rick Sanders)

2012 
 Winner, Austral Wheel Race

2013 
 Winner - Stage 2, Le Tour de Filipinas

2014 
 Winner - 78th Edition, 2014 Melbourne Cup on Wheels

References

External links 
 

1993 births
Living people
Australian male cyclists
Cyclists from Victoria (Australia)
Australian track cyclists
Victorian Institute of Sport alumni